Pope Urban VI (r. 1378–1389) created 42 cardinals in four consistories held throughout his pontificate. In 1381 he named his future successor Pope Boniface IX as a cardinal.

18 September 1378
The pope offered the cardinalate to the Bishop of London William Courtenay though he refused the nomination.
 Tommaso da Frignano O.F.M.
 Pietro Pileo di Prata
 Francesco Moricotti Prignani
 Luca Rodolfucci de Gentili
 Andrea Bontempi Martini
 Bonaventura Badoaro de Peraga O.E.S.A.
 Niccolò Caracciolo Moschino O.P.
 Filippo Carafa
 Galeotto Tarlati de Petramala
 Giovanni d'Amelia
 Filippo Ruffini O.P.
 Poncello Orsini
 Bartolomeo Mezzavacca
 Renoul de Monteruc
 Gentile di Sangro
 Philippe d'Alençon de Valois
 Jan Očko z Vlašim
 Guglielmo Sanseverino
 Eleazario da Sabran
 Dömötör
 Agapito Colonna
 Ludovico di Capua
 Stefano Colonna
 Giovanni Fieschi

21 December 1381
 Adam Easton O.S.B.
 Ludovico Donato O.F.M.
 Bartolomeo da Cogorno O.F.M.
 Francesco Renzio
 Landolfo Maramaldo
 Pietro Tomacelli

1383
 Marino Giudice
 Tommaso Orsini
 Guglielmo di Capua

17 December 1384
The pope was said to have offered the cardinalate to the Archbishop of Cologne Friedrich von Saarwerden and the Archbishop of Mainz  though both refused. In addition, the Archbishop of Trier Kuno von Falkenstein, the Bishop of Liège Arnold von Hoorn O.F.M., the Bishop of Breslau Wenzel von Liegnitz, and Pietro Orsini-Rosenberg (priest from Prague) all declined elevations to the cardinalate. The pope also offered three others the cardinalate, but these three men accepted the promotion from the pope's rival Antipope Clement VII.
 Bálint Alsáni
 Angelo Acciaioli
 Francesco Carbone O.Cist.
 Marino Bulcani
 Rinaldo Brancaccio
 Francesco Castagnola
 Ludovico Fieschi
 Stefano Palosio
  O.S.B. Cam.

Notes and references

Sources

College of Cardinals
Urban VI
 Urb